The MG4 EV is a battery electric small family car (C-segment) produced by the Chinese automotive manufacturer SAIC Motor under the British MG marque. First released in June 2022 as the MG Mulan in China, it is the first vehicle to be based on SAIC's battery electric Modular Scalable Platform (marketed as the Nebula platform in China). It was introduced in Europe as the MG4 EV in July 2022.

Overview 
Developed under the codename EH32, the car was designed as a global model with the European market set as the primary target.

MG also engineered a thinner and flatter battery compared to typical battery electric vehicles with its "One Pack" battery system (called Rubik’s Cube battery system in China). The battery is only  thin for the smallest capacity, which reduces the height of the car. The "One Pack" battery is also designed to be swappable.

The Modular Scalable Platform also enables 800-volt charging technology, which allows the car to achieve a range of  after five minutes of charging and reach 80 percent level within 15 minutes. For models equipped with the regular 400-volt charging technology, five minutes of charging will be enough to reach  of range and take 30 minutes for charging to 80 percent level.

A dual-motor, all-wheel drive model with 64 kWh battery and  will follow.

The MG4 EV is also marketed in Thailand as the MG4 Electric since November 2022. The MG4 EV was launched in Indonesia on 16 February 2023 at the 30th Indonesia International Motor Show.

UK Editions
The MG4 is currently marketed in the UK with the following editions: 
 MG4 EV SE
 MG4 EV SE Long Range
 MG4 EV Trophy

Triumph Edition
The MG Mulan Triumph Edition is a high-performance version of the MG4, so far only confirmed for the Chinese market.

References 

MG4 EV
Cars introduced in 2022
Production electric cars
Rear-wheel-drive vehicles
All-wheel-drive vehicles
Hatchbacks
Euro NCAP small family cars
Cars of China